Shams ibn Uthman was a Sahaba of Muhammad. He was killed in the Battle of Uhud.

External links

Companions of the Prophet